Dent Parrachée is a mountain of Savoie, France. It lies in the Massif de la Vanoise range. It has an elevation of 3,697 metres above sea level.

References

Mountains of the Graian Alps
Alpine three-thousanders
Mountains of Savoie